The 1976 United States presidential election in Kansas took place on November 2, 1976, as part of the 1976 United States presidential election. Kansas voters chose seven representatives, or electors, to the Electoral College, who voted for president and vice president.

Kansas was won by incumbent President Gerald Ford (R–Michigan). with 52.49% of the popular vote, against Jimmy Carter (D–Georgia), with 44.94% of the popular vote. None of the third-party candidates amounted to a significant portion of the vote, but Eugene McCarthy (I–Minnesota) won 1.38% of the popular vote in Kansas, finishing third in the state.

Ford's running mate was Bob Dole, Kansas' junior U.S. senator since 1969. Dole, a native of Russell, was previously the U.S. representative from Kansas's 1st congressional district from 1963-68 after representing the defunct 6th district for one term. 

Despite losing in Kansas, Carter went on to win the national election and became the 39th president of the United States. , this is the last election in which the following counties have voted for a Democratic presidential candidate: Anderson, Butler, Cloud, Edwards, Finney, Ford, Gray, Greeley, Hamilton, Hodgeman, Kingman, Ness, Pawnee, Reno, Rice, Rush, Stafford, Sumner, and Wichita. This was the only occasion between 1964 and 1988 that the Democrats won any Kansas county besides Wyandotte.

Results

Results by county

See also
 United States presidential elections in Kansas

References

Kansas
1976
1976 Kansas elections
1976 in Kansas